Canadian Tire Corporation, Limited is a Canadian retail company which operates in the automotive, hardware, sports, leisure and housewares sectors. Its Canadian operations include: Canadian Tire (including Canadian Tire Petroleum gas stations and financial services subsidiary Canadian Tire Bank), Mark's, FGL Sports (including Sport Chek and Sports Experts), PartSource, and the Canadian operations of Party City. Canadian Tire acquired the Norwegian clothing and textile company Helly Hansen from the Ontario Teachers' Pension Plan in 2018.

Canadian Tire is known for its Canadian Tire money, a loyalty program first introduced in 1958 using paper coupons that resemble banknotes. The company's head office is located at the Canada Square Complex in Toronto, Ontario and it is listed on the Toronto Stock Exchange. It is a participant in the voluntary Scanner Price Accuracy Code managed by the Retail Council of Canada.

History
On October 24, 1922, John William Billes and Alfred Jackson Billes invested their combined savings of $1,800 in the Hamilton Tire and Garage Ltd. (established in 1909 as the Hamilton Garage and Rubber Company) in Toronto. Hamilton Tire and Garage specialized in buying tires at a discount from manufacturers in the winter then reselling the tires during the busy summer season. The brothers opened a retail store at Yonge and Gould streets in Toronto, Ontario.

A product focus on tires was emphasized in 1927 with incorporation of the name Canadian Tire Corporation Limited because, as A.J. Billes said, "...it sounded big". During 1928, the first Canadian Tire catalogues were distributed, consisting of price lists along with road maps.

In 1934, the first official Associate Store was opened in Hamilton, Ontario, by Walker Anderson on King Street. In 1944, to fund its growth, Canadian Tire Corporation became a public company and sold 100,000 shares. By 1945, there were 110 Canadian Tire stores. In 1946, an employee stock purchasing plan was implemented to encourage employee loyalty while discouraging unionization.

The first gas bar opened in 1958 at the corner of Yonge and Church streets in Toronto. Canadian Tire money that gave gas bar customers an in-store discount began in 1958. By June 1961, there were 31 locations. The small financial services company Midland Shoppers Credit Limited was purchased in 1968 and renamed Canadian Tire Acceptance, Limited.

Canadian Tire entered the clothing market by acquiring Mark's Work Warehouse in 2001.

In 2003, CTC established the Canadian Tire Bank, under Canada's Bank Act, from its then-named Canadian Tire Financial Services, Limited, subsidiary along with its Mastercard portfolio, which was later renamed as Canadian Tire Services, Limited, effective January 1, 2015. CTC sold 20% of its Canadian Tire Bank to Scotiabank in 2014.

In April 2018, Triangle Rewards was launched as a replacement to the digital My Canadian Tire Money program and Options Mastercard. Traditional paper Canadian Tire money continues to be offered at some Canadian Tire stores for customers without a rewards card, though at a reduced rate.

In May 2018, the company extended further into the clothing market by acquiring Helly Hansen. As of December 2021, the company operates 667 Canadian Tire stores, 397 SportChek stores, and 381 Mark's stores. The current President and CEO is Greg Hicks.

U.S. expansion attempts
Canadian Tire tried twice to expand into the United States. In 1982, it purchased the Wichita Falls, Texas-based White Stores, Inc. automotive retail chain with 81 stores in Texas from its then owner Household Merchandising Inc., a subsidiary of Household Finance, for US$40.2 million. In 1986, after losing nearly US$100 million they closed some stores and sold the remaining 40 stores, three warehouses and other White assets to Kansas City, Missouri-based Western Auto Supply.

The second time, during the early 1990s, Canadian Tire decided to try to open a specialized auto parts chain called Auto Source that tried to have more than 25,000 different parts on the shelf in each store, more than its competitors. The first Auto Source was opened in Indianapolis in 1991. Unlike the previous attempt, the Auto Source concept was built from scratch. During the next three years, Canadian Tire had opened two Auto Source stores each in Indianapolis, Cincinnati, Dayton, Columbus and Louisville for a total of ten stores before abruptly closing the money-losing chain in 1995. Some of the stores, were sold to Pep Boys.

Although the Auto Source lost nearly CA$60 million during its four years of existence, a scaled down version was used in Canada under the PartSource brand.

Brands

Certain merchandise items are branded specifically for Canadian Tire. The most recognized of these are Mastercraft, which offers a wide range of tools, SuperCycle (bicycles), BluePlanet (eco-friendly household cleaners, CFL bulbs and other green items), Likewise (general household items such as lighting/electrical products and hardware) and Motomaster (tires, batteries and other automotive goods). FRANK branded products are an economy priced line of mainly food and drink as well as household cleaning products, and feature a short humorous tagline on the package.  NOMA, a company that exists in Canada as a trademark only, offering a wide range of items from Christmas lights to air purifiers. During the 1980s, Canadian Tire sold electronic items under the name Pulser (with Canadian Tire logo), such as radios, stereos, televisions, walkmans, cassette tapes, etc. It is unknown when the company began or went defunct.

On May 10, 2017, Canadian Tire announced it would be buying Padinox, the manufacturer of the Paderno brand of kitchen equipment.

Other house brands include: Master Chef for BBQ and outdoor cooking products, Canvas for furniture, Yardworks for lawn care equipment, MAXIMUM for their premium tool line, Woods for camping and outdoor wear gear, Simoniz for car cleaning and care products, Premier paint products. Jobmate for budget priced power tools. Certified for some automotive hardware and some gas powered equipment such as electricity generators and snowblowers.

Operations
At the end of 2018, Canadian Tire employed 12,735 full-time and 17,951 part-time employee in the corporate structure. These figures do not include temporary employees or employees working for Associate Stores, petroleum stores or franchise stores. There is an in-house Triangle Learning Academy, a pun on the CTC logo, for employee and Associate Store management training.

Financial services
Canadian Tire Bank (CTB) is the retail deposit-taking and credit card issuing arm of the company. Held indirectly under the Canadian Tire Services, Limited, holding company, Canadian Tire Bank (CTB), a bank under Canada's Bank Act since 2003. Prior to 2003, all financing occurred under the Canadian Tire Financial Services. In 2014, The Bank of Nova Scotia acquired a 20% economic and voting interest in Canadian Tire Bank, with an option to acquire up to an additional 30% of the company within 10 years (or require Canadian Tire buy back its existing 20% interest) at the then fair market value of business for $500 million CAD in cash.

Ostensibly in tandem with Scotiabank's acquisition of a minority position in Canadian Tire Bank, Canadian Tire renamed its intermediary holding company Canadian Tire Financial Services Limited as Canadian Tire Services, Limited, effective January 1, 2015, dropping the moniker Canadian Tire Financial Services from use. Additionally, in approximately 2018, Canadian Tire rebranded its credit card-issuing online banking website as Canadian Tire Bank, removing the last vestage of Canadian Tire Financial Services from active use.

Petroleum

Canadian Tire Petroleum (CTP), operating as Canadian Tire Gas+, is the division of Canadian Tire which operates gas stations and car washes. CTP was founded in 1958 as a means of increasing customer traffic to Canadian Tire stores. In Ontario, CTP also operates Pit Stop, which provides services like oil changes and rust checks. The Canadian Tire money loyalty program was originally launched through the gas bars as "Gas Bonus Coupons". CTP has opened three Q Stop stores featuring a mini-grocery store as well as other items.

CTP also holds the concession to operate the 24-hour gas stations at ONroute service centres in Ontario along Highway 401 and parts of Highway 400.

Retail
Moody's observed the chain's unique position in Canadian retail as being "often both misunderstood and underestimated" and "completely foreign" in comparison to U.S. retail, citing its variety of products (ranging from auto parts to sporting goods to outdoors products and grocery at some locations), and that "its proprietary 'currency,' Canadian Tire money, which is a by-product of its loyalty program, has been accepted across Canada by multiple retailers and could almost be described as a 'sub-fiat' currency."

In 2009, the chain introduced a new store concept it dubbed the "Smart store" featuring "boutiques" that prominently showcase products within the chain's core product categories. Popular product categories such as auto parts and home goods were moved towards the front of the store to improve their prominence, and some locations began to sell common groceries as a pilot project. 

In June 2015, the chain opened its largest location to-date at South Edmonton Common, which features two floors, widened and expanded departments, various interactive experiences (including a driving simulator and virtual reality), as well as a rotating exhibit of Hockey Canada memorabilia. This remained the largest location until the 100th anniversary opening of the Carlingwood Mall, Ottawa location in September 2022.

With the demise of Target's businesses in Canada in 2015, Canadian Tire acquired the leases of 12 former Target store locations.

In November 2000, Canadian Tire introduced an online retail operation. On January 1, 2009, citing consumer disinterest in online shopping in comparison to its physical stores, the Company discontinued online sales.On November 1, 2013, Canadian Tire returned to online shopping with delivery to stores.

Automotive parts

In addition to the Canadian Tire stores' Parts department CTC owns PartSource, an automotive parts and accessories specialty chain which has 91 stores across Nova Scotia, Ontario, Manitoba, Saskatchewan, and Alberta. It serves commercial automotive installers and do-it-yourself mechanics. Before November 2013, some stores were owned and operated by franchisees; all currently belong to Canadian Tire.

Clothing
In 2001, Canadian Tire acquired Mark's Work Warehouse (now branded as Mark's), a retailer of business casual and work wear, for $116 million. Along with standalone stores, some Canadian Tire locations feature integrated Mark's locations. Due to space constraints some smaller Canadian Tire locations removed their Mark's department when remodelled into the "Smart store" format .

In May 2018, the Ontario Teachers' Pension Plan sold the Norwegian sportswear retailer Helly Hansen to Canadian Tire for $985 million CAD.

Sporting goods
In May 2011, Canadian Tire announced the purchase of Forzani Group, a Canadian sporting goods retailer that operates various brands, including SportChek, Atmosphere, Intersport, Hockey Experts, National Sports, Nevada Bob's Golf, S3, Sport Mart, Sports Experts, Tech Shop, Pro Hockey Life, and The Fitness Source. In February 2021, Canadian Tire announced the closure of all National Sports stores, citing a focus on efficiencies and core assets.

Party City
In October 2019, Canadian Tire closed its acquisition of Party City's Canadian business. As part of the deal, CTC signed a 10-year supply agreement with Party City's parent company Amscan.

Marketing

Advertisements
Historically, Canadian Tire's Christmas ads featured Santa Claus and Ebenezer Scrooge arguing about whether Canadian Tire's selection or their sales prices were the reason to do Christmas shopping there, involving the marketing slogan "Give like Santa, save like Scrooge".

A stamp was issued by Canada Post commemorating Canadian Tire's 75th anniversary based on the Canadian Tire advertisement of a boy (Bike Story) receiving his first bicycle, which was purchased by his father at a Canadian Tire retail store.

Starting in 2007, the company ran month-long advent calendar promotions which provided free CDs and discounts throughout the holiday season.

From 1997 to 2005, the company's ads featured the "Canadian Tire couple". The male role also known as the Canadian Tire guy was played by Canadian actor Ted Simonett, and Gloria Slade played the female role. They are usually showcasing a new product to one of their neighbours, who are in need of a certain tool. The "Canadian Tire Couple" were featured on Royal Canadian Air Farce as one of their targets of the year, as "Canada's most annoying couple". They also made a feature guest appearance on Royal Canadian Air Farce as actors in a skit.

In early 2006, ads featuring the couple were phased out and replaced by a new campaign featuring overhead signs found in Canadian Tire's store aisles.

In 2013, Canadian Tire produced a commercial promoting its MasterCraft Eliminator Ultra car battery and its ability to function in extreme cold, which featured a stripped GMC Sierra pickup truck with its body re-created as an ice sculpture. The ad premiered during the 2014 NHL Winter Classic.

In March 2015, Canadian Tire launched a new ongoing marketing campaign, "Tested for Life in Canada". The campaign, which includes television advertising and in-store labels, showcases products that have been vetted based on input by a consumer focus group recruited by the chain, as well as their reviews of the products. The program also collects feedback that is used to help improve products marketed by Canadian Tire.

Sports sponsorships

Motorsport

During the 1980s, the company sponsored an IndyCar racing team. Alfred J. Billes's son David Billes was a Canadian Corvette racer before opening Performance Engineering Ltd. He was later Jacques Villeneuve Sr.'s car owner in CART IndyCar competition in the early 1980s and entered two cars in the 1985 Indianapolis 500. In 1985, Jacques Villeneuve Sr. won the race at Road America.

David Billes was inducted into the Canadian Motorsport Hall of Fame in 1994.

The company has had naming rights at Canadian Tire Motorsport Park, formerly known as Mosport International Raceway, since 2012.

Other sports
The home arena of the Ottawa Senators of the National Hockey League (NHL) has been known as the Canadian Tire Centre since 2013.

See also
 List of Canadian department stores
 NASCAR Canadian Tire Series

References

External links

 
 

 
Companies listed on the Toronto Stock Exchange
S&P/TSX 60
Companies based in Toronto
Hardware stores of Canada
History of Hamilton, Ontario
Canadian brands
Retail companies established in 1922
1922 establishments in Ontario
Canadian companies established in 1922